WNLA-FM (95.3 FM) is an oldies formatted broadcast radio station. The station is licensed to Drew, Mississippi and serves Drew and Northern and Central Sunflower County in Mississippi. WNLA-FM is licensed to Fenty L. Fuss and is operated by Delta Radio Network.

References

External links
Oldies 98.3 Online

2015 establishments in Mississippi
Oldies radio stations in the United States
Radio stations established in 2015
NLA-FM